The Two of Us (Swedish: Vi två) is a 1930 drama film directed by John W. Brunius and starring Edvin Adolphson, Margit Manstad and Erik Berglund. It was produced and distributed by the Swedish subsidiary of Paramount Pictures at the company's Joinville Studios. It was one of a large number of multiple-language versions shot at Joinville during the early years of the sound era. It is a Swedish-language remake of the 1929 Hollywood film The Lady Lies.

Synopsis
A New York widower shocks his two grown-up children when he takes up with a shop assistant in a fashion store, and they seek to break up the developing relationship.

Cast
 Edvin Adolphson as 	Robert Rossiter
 Margit Manstad as Joyce Roamer
 Erik Berglund as Charles Tyler
 Märta Ekström as 	Miriam Pearson
 Ivan Hedqvist as 	Henry Tuttle	
 Anne-Marie Brunius as 	Josephine Rossiter
 Ragnar Falck as 	Bob Rossiter
 Anna-Lisa Fröberg as 	Amelia Tuttle, Henry Tuttles fru
 Britta Vieweg as 		Ann Gardner
 Elsa de Castro as Första expediten på Yvonne Modes

References

Bibliography 
 Goble, Alan. The Complete Index to Literary Sources in Film. Walter de Gruyter, 1999.
 Sadoul, Georges. Dictionary of Film Makers. University of California Press, 1972.

External links 
 

1930 films
American drama films
Swedish drama films
1930 drama films
1930s Swedish-language films
Films directed by John W. Brunius
Swedish black-and-white films
Swedish films based on plays
Films shot at Joinville Studios
Paramount Pictures films
Films set in New York City
1930s American films
1930s Swedish films